William Holden (1 April 1928 – 26 January 2011) was an English professional footballer who played as a centre forward for several clubs in the Football League.

References

External links
Bill Holden career stats at the Post-War Players Database

1928 births
2011 deaths
Footballers from Bolton
English footballers
Association football forwards
Burnley F.C. players
Sunderland A.F.C. players
Stockport County F.C. players
Bury F.C. players
Halifax Town A.F.C. players
Great Harwood F.C. players
English Football League players